Mohammed Mark Amin is an Iranian American motion picture producer, distributor and writer who has been working in independent and mainstream cinema for more than two decades.  Some of Amin's film credits include The Prince and Me (2004), starring Julia Stiles, 1997's Eve's Bayou, starring Samuel L. Jackson, and 2002's Frida, a biopic which Amin executive produced.

Amin served as producer for the Lionsgate/Roadside Attractions film Girl Most Likely (2012), starring Annette Bening and Matt Dillon, as well as producer for Eliza Graves (2014), starring Kate Beckinsale, Jim Sturgess, Ben Kingsley and Michael Caine.  Most recently, Amin's film production company, Sobini Films, assisted in the production of Miles Ahead, starring Don Cheadle and Ewan McGregor.  Sobini also served as a producer for Good Kill (2015) with Ethan Hawke.

Besides his career as a film producer, Amin has also been active in other business and investment interests.  Amin is an investor and member of the advisory board of EdgeCast, a content delivery firm which sold in 2013 to Verizon for $400 million.  He is also chairman and major shareholder of gymra.com, the fitness website. Additionally, Amin is active in the development of almond and pistachio orchards in central California.

Early life and education
Amin is originally from Rafsanjan, a small town in Iran.  Raised in a family that was in the pistachio trading business, Amin immigrated to the United States in 1967, finishing out his last year of high school in Colorado.

In 1972, Amin graduated from the University of Kansas with a degree in economics. After earning his bachelor's degree, Amin attended New York University's business school for one semester.  However, New York City proved too overwhelming and Amin transferred to the Graduate School of Management at the University of California, Los Angeles.  Amin graduated from the management school with a Masters of Business Administration in Marketing in 1975.

Career

Early career
After graduating from management school, Amin worked for Western Gear, a construction machinery firm, and returned to Iran as the company's representative.

In 1979, political and military conflict arose in Iran.  As a result, Amin moved to Europe and then returned to Los Angeles.  Following his return, Amin became involved in a number of businesses, including real estate, petrochemicals and commodities.

Early film career
Amin's career in the film industry started in the early 1980s through his involvement with a chain of video stores in Los Angeles known as 20/20 Video.  In 1985, Amin formed Vidmark Entertainment, an "aggressive independent supplier"  of video releases operating in the early era of home video entertainment.  Among their niches was obtaining the videocassette rights to Television films often made as TV movies of the week. It was with the financial success of Vidmark's early video releases  that inspired Amin to further expand his efforts as a producer.

Trimark Pictures
With an initial investment of $270,000, Amin co-founded Trimark Holdings, a company which would include among its subsidiaries, Trimark Pictures, Trimark Television and Trimark Interactive.  Amin served as chairman and CEO of the newly formed company.  Trimark Pictures went on to release such titles as Warlock (1989), The Dentist (1996) and the Leprechaun franchise (the first of which starred a young Jennifer Aniston).

In 2000, Trimark merged with Lions Gate Entertainment in a move that made Amin Lionsgate's single largest shareholder, as well as its vice chairman.  During Amin's nine-year tenure as vice chairman of Lionsgate, the company's revenue grew from $184 million to $1.2 billion.  The production company also produced and distributed film releases that included Monster's Ball (2001), starring Halle Berry, which earned her an Academy Award for Best Actress, and Academy Award for Best Picture-winner, Crash (2004).

During this time, Amin also became chairman of CinemaNow, an online independent film distributor.

Sobini Films
In 2001, Amin founded Sobini Films, a production company focused on producing specialized and mainstream commercial films.  Since its founding, Sobini Films has produced a number of films, including Streets of Legend (2003), a Sundance award winner, An American Girl: Chrissa Stands Strong (2009) and "Sexy Evil Genius" (2013).  Sobini Films has several upcoming projects in various stages of production, including "Stonehearst Asylum" and "I Live For You".

Controversy over DuPont Fabros Technology Inc. Stock
In 2012, the SEC alleged that Mark Amin learned confidential information about expanding business opportunities for DuPont Fabros Technology Inc., which develops and manages facilities that maintain large computer servers for technology companies. It was alleged that Amin tipped his brother and cousin with this confidential information. The three allegedly illegally traded on the basis of that inside information and allegedly gained profits from this insider trading. Mark Amin and five others agreed to settle the SEC's charges by collectively paying nearly $2 million.

Personal life

Philanthropic efforts and contributions
In 1997, Amin donated $25,000 to the University of Kansas to start a scholarship for those students studying film at the school.

In 2000, Amin and his brother, Reza Amin, formed the Bijan and Soraya Amin Foundation, which has helped support organizations that include the National Ability Center, the Brady Center to Prevent Gun Violence, the University Muslim Medical Association.

In 2011, Amin produced a documentary entitled "Jujitsu-ing Reality" on Scott Lew, a screenwriter with amyotrophic lateral sclerosis, or ALS.  On May 29, 2014, Amin was recognized for increasing support and awareness of ALS at the ALS Association Golden West Chapter A Night at the Esseys Awards.

Amin is a member of the Board of Trustees of the Farhang Foundation, an organization which promotes the study and research of Iranian art and culture.

Recognition
In 2010, Amin earned an Alumni Distinguished Achievement Award from his alma mater, the University of Kansas.

Filmography

Theatrical releases

References

Living people
American film producers
1950 births
Iranian diaspora film people
People from Rafsanjan
Iranian emigrants to the United States